Orthomegas marechali is a species of beetle in the family Cerambycidae. It is found in Nicaragua, Costa Rica, Panama and Colombia.

References

Beetles described in 1993
Prioninae